Ángela Pumariega Menéndez  (born 12 November 1984 in Gijón) is a Spanish sailor. She won the gold medal in sailing at the 2012 Summer Olympics in the Elliott 6m class, in the crew led by Támara Echegoyen and accompanied by Sofía Toro.

Previously, she was a junior Spanish champion and second at the Europeans in the Snipe class in 2002 and second at the Spanish women's nationals in 2008 also in Snipe.

Since May 2019, Pumariega acts as councilor in the city hall of Gijón after contesting as independent for the lists of the People's Party of Asturias in the local elections.

See also
 List of Olympic medalists in sailing

Notes

References

External links
 
 
 
 

1984 births
Colegio de la Inmaculada (Gijón) alumni
Living people
Medalists at the 2012 Summer Olympics
Olympic gold medalists for Spain
Olympic medalists in sailing
Olympic sailors of Spain
Real Club Astur de Regatas sailors
Sailors at the 2012 Summer Olympics – Elliott 6m
Snipe class sailors
Spanish female sailors (sport)
Sportspeople from Gijón
Politicians from Asturias